Chintpurni Marg is station between Nagal Dam– Una Himchal–Amb Andaura–Daulatpur Chowk rail line.

References 

Railway stations in Himachal Pradesh